Mike Powell is a British former newspaper and radio journalist who hosted shows on several UK music radio stations before transitioning to station management.

After working in provincial newspapers in the Westcountry, Powell joined DevonAir Radio (Exeter and Torbay) at its launch in 1980 as a senior journalist, then Head of News and Current Affairs. He later jointly hosted the breakfast show.

Powell moved to Guildford, Surrey in 1983 as launch News Editor of County Sound Radio. He was promoted to Program Director from 1984 to 1986 and then CEO from 1986 to 1991 - growing the group to four radio stations. His innovations at County Sound included being the first UK radio station to use RCS (Radio Computing Services) Selector music-scheduling software 24 hours a day and introducing the UK's first gold format radio station (County Sound Gold). Powell designed the programming for award-winning station, Fox FM - a joint venture with Capital Radio (London).

After taking County Sound to a UK stock market listing, he departed to form radio investment, research and management company, Infinity Radio, which set up Pirate FM (Cornwall) with Powell as launch CEO. Pirate FM was featured on the BBC technology programme, Tomorrow's World, for its pioneering use of computerised music playout.

Shortly after the launch of Pirate FM, Infinity Radio merged with UKRD Group where Powell became CEO - eventually building the group to over 20 radio stations and associated companies.

While running UKRD, Powell played a key role in launching Manchester's Kiss 102 and served as launch CEO of Berkshire's Star FM, which was joint launch customer in the UK for the computerised RCS Master Control studio automation system. In 1995, he launched the new County Sound Radio Network consisting of County Sound Radio, 96.4 The Eagle and Delta Radio.

In 2001 Powell became Chairman of Infinity Media which then separated from UKRD to concentrate on digital platform technologies.

In October 2002, he joined RCS as Vice President of its International division, based at its World Headquarters in White Plains, New York. In October 2014 he was promoted to Senior Vice President International Operations and Chief Compliance Officer.

References

 County Sound history
 Infinity demerger from UKRD
 RCS executive profile page

English radio presenters
British radio DJs
Living people
Year of birth missing (living people)